Jack Welsby (born 17 March 2001) is an English professional rugby league footballer who plays as a  or er for St Helens in the Super League and England at international level.

Background
Welsby was born in Wigan, Lancashire. Playing for Shevington Sharks ARLFC as a child.

Playing career

Club career
In 2018, he made his Super League début for St Helens against Hull FC.
He played in the club's 8-4 2020 Super League Grand Final victory over Wigan at the Kingston Communications Stadium in Hull.

In the final seconds of play with the scores at 4-4, St Helens attempted a field goal which rebounded off the goal post.  Welsby was the first player to the ball from the ricochet and he scored after the full-time siren to win the match for St Helens.

Welsby played for St Helens in their 2021 Challenge Cup Final victory over Castleford.

In round 17 of the 2021 Super League season, Welsby scored a hat-trick in St Helens 42-10 over Hull F.C.

On 9 October, Welsby played for St Helens in their 2021 Super League Grand Final victory over Catalans Dragons.

In round 20 of the 2022 Betfred Super League season, Welsby kicked a drop goal in golden point extra-time to win the match for St Helens 13-12 against bottom placed Wakefield Trinity.  In September, Welsby was awarded young player of the year at the 2022 Super League awards ceremony.

On 24 September, Welsby provided two try assists in St Helens 24-12 Grand Final victory over Leeds.
In the 2023 World Club Challenge, Welsby scored the opening try for St Helens in their 13-12 upset victory over Penrith.

International career
On 15 October, Welsby made his England debut against Samoa in the 2021 Rugby League World Cup scoring one try and providing two assists as England won the match 60-6.
Welsby played in all five matches for England at the tournament including the semi-final where he made a crucial handling error in golden point extra-time against Samoa. England would go on to lose the match 27-26 at the Emirates Stadium.

References

External links

St Helens profile
SL profile
Saints Heritage Society profile
England profile

2001 births
Living people
England national rugby league team players
English rugby league players
Rugby league halfbacks
Rugby league players from Wigan
St Helens R.F.C. players